Kwa (Bakwa) is a minor Bamileke language of Cameroon.

References

Languages of Cameroon
Bamileke languages